Creil is the railway station serving the northern French city of Creil. It is an important railway junction, situated on the Paris–Lille railway, the Creil–Jeumont railway and the branch lines to Beauvais and Pontoise.

The station is served by omnibus trains to Paris as well as regional services to and from Amiens, Compiègne and further. As well as Intercités trains, Creil is well served by TER trains, RER D and is part of the TER Hauts-de-France network.

References

External links 

 

Railway stations in France opened in 1846
Railway stations in Oise